The 2017–18 Montenegrin Cup was the 12th season of the knockout football tournament in Montenegro. This competition began on 23 August 2017 and ended on 30 May 2018. The winners of the competition earned a spot in the 2018–19 UEFA Europa League.

Sutjeska were the defending champions after winning the cup in the previous season. They were eliminated in the quarter-finals.

Format
Twenty–six clubs competed in the competition this season. The first round and the final were competed over one leg and the other rounds were competed over two legs.

First round
Twelve first round matches were played on 23 and 24 August 2017.

Summary

|}

Matches

Second round
Sixteen clubs competed in the second round played over two legs from 13 to 27 September 2017.

Summary

|}

First legs

Second legs

Quarter-finals
Eight clubs competed in the quarter-finals played over two legs on 1 November and 22 November 2017.

Summary

|}

First legs

Second legs

Semi-finals
Four clubs competed in the semi-finals played over two legs on 18 April and 2 May 2018.

Summary

|}

First legs

Second legs

Final

See also
 Montenegrin Cup
 Montenegrin First League

References

External links
Montenegrin Cup 2017-2018 at Football Association of Montenegro's official site
Montenegrin Cup 2017-2018 at Soccerway

Montenegrin Cup seasons
Cup
Montenegro